Bang Lamphu Lang is a khwaeng (subdistrict) of Khlong San district, Bangkok's Thonburi side (west bank of Chao Phraya river).

History
Originally, Bang Lamphu Lang was a name of all Khlong San area. Its name changed to Khlong San in the reign of King Vajiravudh (Rama VI).  It became part of Bangkok after the merging of Thonburi and Phra Nakhon provinces in 1971.

Its name "Bang Lamphu Lang" meaning "lower place of mangrove apples".  Its name has a similar origin to Bang Lamphu in Phra Nakhon side (ฺBangkok core). Because, in the past it was considered an area adjacent to the Chao Phraya river and was a source of mangrove apples (Sonneratia caseolaris, or lamphu in Thai) that grow along the river banks. These trees are also the habitat of fireflies. Today, alike to Bang Lamphu, although mangrove apples and fireflies have disappeared, but its name is still used for this area.

Bang Lamphu Lang (including other areas of Khlong San) in the past was the location of many large businesses, such as salt warehouse, fish sauce factory, wheat flour mill, saw mill and tannery. It was also the home of a rich family of Thai Chinese descent, such as Wanglee, Pisolyabutra, Kiangsiri, including an influential noble family Bunnag. Later on, an Indian businessman Ibrahim Ali Nana  bought and rented land in this area to live and conduct business among the fellow Indians, until becoming an Indian settlement. He was an ancestor of the Nana family, whose descendants include Lek Nana.

Geography
Bang Lamphu Lang has an area of 2.47 km2 (0.95 mi2).

Charoen Nakhon road is a main route of the subdistrict.

Neighbouring subdistricts are (from the north clockwise): Khlong Ton Sai in its district, Yan Nawa of Sathon district and Wat Phraya Krai of Bang Kho Laem district (across Chao Phraya river), Samre and Bukkhalo of Thon Buri district.

Places
Wat Sawettachat Worawihan
Wat Suttharam and Wat Suttharam High School
Lim Clansmen Association of Thailand
 Charoen Nakhon Animal Hospital

References

Subdistricts of Bangkok
Khlong San district
Populated places on the Chao Phraya River